Scott Hassan is a computer programmer and entrepreneur who was the main programmer of the original Google Search engine, then known as BackRub. He was research assistant at Stanford University at the time. Hassan left before Google was officially founded as a company. 

In 1997 Hassan founded FindMail, later renamed to eGroups.com, an email list management web site. The company was bought by Yahoo! for $432m in a stock deal and became Yahoo! Groups.

In 2006 Hassan started Willow Garage, a robotics research lab and technology incubator. The organization created the open source robotics software suite ROS (Robot Operating System). Willow Garage shut down in early 2014.

Personal life
Hassan married consultant and web developer Allison Huynh in 2001. She had emigrated to the United States from Vietnam after the Vietnam War. They met through mutual friends at Stanford and had three children. In 2014, Hassan informed Allison of his intention to divorce her. Disagreements over the division of their assets were taken to trial in 2021. Before the trial, Hassan admitted to having started a website in Huynh's name containing "embarrassing information from her past".

References

American computer businesspeople
American technology company founders
Businesspeople in information technology
Businesspeople in software
Google employees
Living people
Year of birth missing (living people)